Mariceras is a genus of Late Carboniferous to Early Permian nautilids found in North America and central Asia.
Its shell is like that of Schyphoceras but is less curved and smoother.

References

 Mariceras Fossilworks entry.
 Bernhard Kummel, 1964. Nautiloidea-Nautilida. Treatise on Invertebrate Paleontology, Part K. Geological Society of America.

Prehistoric nautiloid genera
Pennsylvanian first appearances
Cisuralian genus extinctions